Ermita de la Magdalena (Monsacro) is a Roman Catholic hermitage in the municipality of Morcín, autonomous community of Asturias, Spain. It is located near the peak of Monsacro. It is nearby the Ermita de Santiago (Monsacro). It was listed as a historical monument in 1992.

See also
Asturian art
Catholic Church in Spain
Churches in Asturias
List of oldest church buildings

References

Churches in Asturias
Christian hermitages in Spain
Bien de Interés Cultural landmarks in Asturias